Franz Josef Hoop (14 December 1895 – 19 October 1959) was a political figure from Liechtenstein who served as Prime Minister of Liechtenstein from 1928 to 1945.

Early life

Hoop attended high school in Feldkirch, Austria, and for a short time afterwards attended school in Zürich, Switzerland. After finishing his school, Hoop took up post-secondary education at the University of Innsbruck, where he devoted himself to the study of Oriental languages. Hoop graduated in 1920, with a doctorate in philosophy. Hoop served as the Attaché and Chargé d'affaires at the Liechtenstein legation in Vienna from 1920 until 1923, when it was closed. From 1924 to 1928 he worked for the Swiss customs administration in Geneva and St. Gallen.

Prime Minister of Liechtenstein

Hoop was the third Prime Minister of Liechtenstein, from 4 August 1928 to 3 September 1945. The 1928 Liechtenstein parliamentary election resulted with a win for the Progressive Citizens' Party, and Hoop was appointed to serve as Prime Minister.

During World War II Hoop considered friendly, non-binding, non-provocative diplomacy to be appropriate towards Nazi Germany, supplemented by courtesy gestures. In 1940, during a lecture in Stuttgart, Hoop showed respect for the German armies. At the same time, he tied the country as closely as possible to Switzerland during the war in hopes of retaining Liechtenstein's neutrality. He achieved the de facto inclusion of Liechtenstein in the Swiss national supply. 

Hoop resigned in September 1945, after serving in the premiership for seventeen years.

Later life

After resigning as Prime Minister, Hoop soon went on to study law at the University of Zurich and then at the University of Innsbruck in 1946, where he graduated and received a doctorate in 1948. From 1948 he worked as a lawyer in Vaduz.

Hoop later went on to serve as a board member for the National Bank of Liechtenstein, and President of the Liechtenstein Constitutional Court. He went on to be elected to the Landtag in 1957, where he served until his death in 1959. He was President of the Landtag from 1958 to 1959.

Death 
Hoop died on 19 October 1959, at the age of 63 years old.

Honours 

  : Grand Star of the Order of Merit of the Principality of Liechtenstein.

References

See also

 Politics of Liechtenstein

Heads of government of Liechtenstein
Speakers of the Landtag of Liechtenstein
Progressive Citizens' Party politicians
University of Innsbruck alumni
1895 births
1959 deaths